Nagpur Institute of Technology (NIT), is an engineering college in Nagpur district that is affiliated to Rashtrasant Tukadoji Maharaj Nagpur University and approved by All India Council for Technical Education, New Delhi, Directorate of Technical Education, Maharashtra, Mumbai, NAAC.

Departments

Computer Science & Engg.	
Information Technology
Civil Engg.
Electrical Engg.
Mechanical Engg.

References

External links
  List of Affiliated colleges of Nagpur university 
 Official web site of NIT nagpur
 Facebook page of NIT nagpur
 Student's site for NIT Nexus

Engineering colleges in Nagpur